The Magic of Walt Disney World is a 1972 documentary featurette produced by Walt Disney Productions. Filmed at the then-new Walt Disney World resort in Florida, this film served as a tour of the Magic Kingdom theme park, the resort hotels and other areas within the "Vacation Kingdom". It was narrated by actor Steve Forrest.

The film was released on the same bill as the Disney feature Snowball Express. An expanded and updated version, with new narration by Andrew Duggan, was broadcast as part of The Wonderful World of Disney on March 31, 1974.

References

External links

1972 documentary films
1972 films
American short documentary films
Disney documentary films
Disney short films
Films scored by Buddy Baker (composer)
Films produced by Ron W. Miller
1970s short documentary films
Walt Disney Pictures films
Walt Disney World
Films shot in Florida
1970s English-language films
1970s American films